The Marche regional election of 1980 took place on 8 June 1980.

Events
The Italian Communist Party was the largest party, narrowly ahead of Christian Democracy, but again it obtained less seats for a trick of the electoral law. Consequently, after the election Emidio Massi, the incumbent Socialist President, formed a new government including also the Christian Democracy, the Italian Democratic Socialist Party and the Italian Republican Party (organic centre-left).

Results

Source: Ministry of the Interior

References

Elections in Marche
1980 elections in Italy